Strossmayeria is a genus of fungi in the family Helotiaceae. The genus contains 16 species. The genus was circumscribed by Stephan Schulzer von Müggenburg in Oesterr. Bot. Z. vol.31 on page 314 in 1881.

The genus name of Strossmayeria is in honour of Josip Juraj Strossmayer (1815–1905), who was an Austrian-Hungarian clergyman. He was Bishop of Đakovo, Croatia.

Species
As accepted by Species Fungorum;

 Strossmayeria alba 
 Strossmayeria alnicola 
 Strossmayeria atriseda 
 Strossmayeria australiensis 
 Strossmayeria bakeriana 
 Strossmayeria basitricha 
 Strossmayeria calamicola 
 Strossmayeria confluens 
 Strossmayeria dickorfii 
 Strossmayeria immarginata 
 Strossmayeria introspecta 
 Strossmayeria jamaicensis 
 Strossmayeria japonica 
 Strossmayeria josserandii 
 Strossmayeria nigra 
 Strossmayeria notabilis 
 Strossmayeria ochrospora 
 Strossmayeria phaeocarpa 
 Strossmayeria sordida 
 Strossmayeria sphenospora 

Former species;
 S. longispora  = Strossmayeria bakeriana
 S. ostoyae  = Strossmayeria bakeriana
 S. rackii  = Strossmayeria basitricha
 S. viridiatra  = Claussenomyces prasinulus, Tympanidaceae

References

Helotiaceae